The petrosquamous sinus is a fetal vein that generally disappears by birth and, when present, runs backward along the junction of the squama and petrous portion of the temporal, and opens into the transverse sinus.

References

Veins of the head and neck